Grethe Werner (28 May 1928 – 30 October 2014) was a Norwegian sportswoman, a pioneer in women's sport in Norway, active in handball, gymnastics and track and field athletics. She was born in Oslo, and was married to Olaf Evjenth. She represented the clubs Grefsen IL (handball), Oslo Turnforening (gymnastics), and Torshaug IF (track and field).

Career
Werner played 35 matches for the Norwegian women's national handball team between 1946 and 1960, including the very first handball match for the Norwegian national team, against Sweden at Bislett Stadium in front of 9.000 spectators in September 1946. She represented the handball club , with which she won the national cup six times, (five times the outdoor cup, and once the indoor cup).

She competed in gymnastics at the 1952 Summer Olympics in Helsinki.

In track and field athletics, she was Norwegian champion in shot put in 1948 and 1953, and in discus throw in 1949. She also competed in javelin throw, swing-ball throw, long jump, and in athletics triathlon. She held the Norwegian record in shot put.

She died in Oslo on 30 October 2014.

References

External links

1928 births
2014 deaths
Sportspeople from Oslo
Norwegian female handball players
Norwegian female artistic gymnasts
Olympic gymnasts of Norway
Gymnasts at the 1952 Summer Olympics
Norwegian female discus throwers
Norwegian female javelin throwers
Norwegian female shot putters
Norwegian female long jumpers